Wayne Brent Meredith (born October 4, 1939) is an American former ice hockey defenseman and Olympian.

Meredith played with Team USA at the 1964 Winter Olympics held in Innsbruck, Austria. He played for the University of Minnesota and for the St. Paul Saints of the International Hockey League.

References

External links

1939 births
Living people
Ice hockey players from Indiana
Ice hockey players at the 1964 Winter Olympics
Olympic ice hockey players of the United States
Sportspeople from South Bend, Indiana
American men's ice hockey defensemen
Minnesota Golden Gophers men's ice hockey players